Pío Cabanillas may refer to:

Pío Cabanillas Gallas (1923–1991), Spanish minister of Information and Tourism between 1974 and 1975 and Minister of Justice between 1981 and 1982.
Pío Cabanillas Alonso (1958–), spokesperson minister of the Spanish government between 2000 and 2002.